William Herbert New  (born March 28, 1938) is a Canadian poet and literary critic. Born in Vancouver, British Columbia, he was educated at John Oliver Secondary School, where he  received one of the top matriculation exam scores in British Columbia in 1956, the University of British Columbia, and the University of Leeds. He taught English literature at the University of British Columbia from 1965 to 2003, where he was also the Assistant Dean of Graduate Studies from 1975–1977, and an acting head of the English Department. He also was an associate in 1971 at Cambridge University's Clare Hall. On October 5, 2006, he was appointed an Officer of the Order of Canada and was invested  October 26, 2007.

For 29 years, he held editorial positions at Canadian Literature and, in 2004, was made Editor Emeritus.

He is the son of John New and Edith (Littlejohn). On July 6, 1967, William married Margaret Elizabeth Francis Ebbs-Canavan.

He is the father of actor Peter New.

Selected bibliography

Criticism
Introduction to The Stone Angel — 1967
Malcolm Lowry — 1971
Articulating West — 1972
Among Worlds: An Introduction to Modern Commonwealth and South African Fiction — 1975
Malcolm Lowry: A Reference Guide — 1978
Dreams of Speech and Violence: The Art of the Short Story in Canada and New Zealand — 1987
A History of Canadian Literature — 1989
Land Sliding: Imagining Space, Presence & Power in Canadian Writing — 1997
Reading Mansfield and Metaphors of Form — 1999
 The Encyclopedia of Canadian Literature. University of Toronto, 2002
Grandchild of Empire: About Irony, Mainly in the Commonwealth — 2003
From a Speaking Place: Writings from the first 50 years of Canadian Literature — 2009

Poetry
Science Lessons — 1996
Raucous — 1999
Stone | Rain — 2001
Riverbook and Ocean — 2002
Night Room — 2003
Underwood Log — 2004
Touching Ecuador — 2006
Along a Snake Fence Riding — 2007
The Rope-maker's Tale — 2009
YVR — 2011
New & Selected Poems — 2015
Neighbors — 2017
In the Plague Year — 2021

Children's books
Vanilla Gorilla — 1998
Llamas in the Laundry — 2002
Dream Helmet — 2005
The Year I Was Grounded — 2008
Sam Swallow and the Riddleworld League — 2013

Anthologies edited
Four Hemispheres — 1971
Voice and Vision — 1972 (with Jack Hodgins)
Dramatists in Canada — 1972
Critical Writings on Commonwealth Literatures: A Bibliography — 1975
Modern Stories in English — 1975 (with H.J. Rosengarten)
Modern Canadian Essays — 1976
Margaret Laurence: The Writer and Her Critics — 1977
A Political Art: Essays and Images in Honour of George Woodcock — 1978
Active Voice — 1980 (with W.E. Messenger)
The Active Stylist — 1981 (with W.E. Messenger)
A 20th Century Anthology — 1984
Canadian Short Fiction — 1986
Canadian Writers Since 1960 — 1986
Canadian Writers Since 1960, 2nd series — 1987
Canadian Writers 1920-1959 — 1988
Canadian Writers 1920-1959, 2nd series — 1989
Native Writers and Canadian Writing — 1990
Canadian Writers Before 1890 — 1990
Canadian Writers 1890-1920 — 1990
Inside the Poem — 1992
Literature in English — 1993 (with W.E. Messenger)
Encyclopedia of Literature in Canada — 2002
Tropes and Territories: Short Fiction, Postcolonial Readings, Canadian Writings in Context — 2007 (with Marta Dvorak)
From a Speaking Place: Writings from the First Fifty Years of Canadian Literature — 2009 (with Réjean Beaudoin, Susan Fisher, Iain Higgins, Eva-Marie Kröller and Laurie Ricou)

Honors and awards
 Killam Research and Teaching Prize — 1988, 1996 
 Royal Society of Canada — elected 1986 
 Gabrielle Roy Award — 1988 
 Jacob Biely Prize — 1995 
 Association of Canadian Studies Award of Merit — 2000 
 Confederation of University Faculty Associations of B.C. Career Achievement Award — 2001 
 VP Research Award — 2002 
 Lorne Pierce medal by the Royal Society of Canada for achievement in critical and imaginative literature — 2004  
 Officer in the Order of Canada — 2006 
 Queen Elizabeth II Diamond Jubilee Medal — 2012 
 Mayor's Award for Literary Arts in Vancouver — 2012 
 City of Vancouver Book Award — 2012 
 George Woodcock Lifetime Achievement Award — 2013

References

External links
 Canadian literature in English , Author W. H. New, The Canadian Encyclopedia, 2012, rev. 2017

1938 births
Living people
Canadian literary critics
20th-century Canadian poets
Canadian male poets
Fellows of the Royal Society of Canada
Writers from Vancouver
Officers of the Order of Canada
University of British Columbia alumni
Academic staff of the University of British Columbia
20th-century Canadian male writers
Canadian male non-fiction writers